The Hours of Hennessy or Hours of Notre-Dame is a 1530 illuminated book of Hours attributed to the Bruges artist Simon Bening and his workshop. Its original commissioner is unknown and it is unknown how it was acquired by its later owners the Irish Hennessy family. It was bought for 12,000 Belgian francs from Peter Hennessy's heirs by the Royal Library of Belgium in 1874, and is one of its most important manuscripts.

See also
Golf book

References

16th-century illuminated manuscripts
Hennessy